Erica Flapan (born August 14, 1956) is an American mathematician, the Lingurn H. Burkhead Professor of Mathematics at Pomona College.

Education and career
Flapan did her undergraduate studies at Hamilton College (New York), graduating in 1977, and went on to graduate studies at the University of Wisconsin–Madison, earning a Ph.D. in 1983 under the supervision of Daniel McMillan.

After postdoctoral studies at Rice University and the University of California, Santa Barbara she joined the Pomona faculty in 1986. Flapan's research is in low-dimensional topology and knot theory.

Books
Flapan is the author or coauthor of books including:
When Topology Meets Chemistry: A Topological Look at Molecular Chirality (Cambridge University Press and Mathematical Association of America, 2000)
Number Theory: A Lively Introduction with Proofs, Applications, and Stories (with James Pommersheim and Tim Marks, John Wiley & Sons, 2010)
Knots, Molecules, and the Universe: An Introduction to Topology (2015)

Her edited volumes include Applications of Knot Theory (with Dorothy Buck, 2009), Knots, Links, Spatial Graphs, and Algebraic Invariants (with Allison Henrich, Aaron Kaestner, and Sam Nelson, 2017), and Topology and Geometry of Biopolymers (with Helen Wong, 2018).

Recognition
In 2011, Flapan was one of three winners of the Deborah and Franklin Tepper Haimo Award for Distinguished College or University Teaching of Mathematics, from the Mathematical Association of America. In 2012 she became a fellow of the American Mathematical Society, and in the same year as part of the bicentennial of Hamilton College was honored with a Hamilton Alumni Achievement Medal. In recognition of her devotion to mentoring, Flapan won the M. Gweneth Humphreys Award from the Association for Women in Mathematics in 2018. She will deliver the Chan Stanek Lecture for Students at MathFest 2021.

References

1956 births
Living people
20th-century American mathematicians
21st-century American mathematicians
American women mathematicians
Topologists
Hamilton College (New York) alumni
University of Wisconsin–Madison alumni
Pomona College faculty
Fellows of the American Mathematical Society
20th-century women mathematicians
21st-century women mathematicians
Mathematicians from New York (state)
20th-century American women
21st-century American women